Ōyutaka Masachika  (born 29 March 1955 as Eiji Suzuki) is a former sumo wrestler from Horinouchi, Niigata, Japan. He made his professional debut in November 1973, and reached the top division in May 1982. His highest rank was komusubi. He retired in January 1987, and became an elder in the Japan Sumo Association under the name Arashio. He opened Arashio stable in 2002. His son fought for the stable under the shikona Chikarayama, retiring in January 2017. Arashio-oyakata reached the mandatory retirement age of 65 in March 2020, and was replaced as head coach of the stable by his most successful wrestler, maegashira Sōkokurai. Sōkokurai had been expelled from sumo in 2011 for alleged match-fixing, but Arashio always stood by his wrestler, and Sōkokurai was re-admitted to sumo in 2013 after winning a court case.

Career record

See also
Glossary of sumo terms
List of past sumo wrestlers
List of sumo elders
List of sumo tournament second division champions
List of komusubi

References

1955 births
Living people
Japanese sumo wrestlers
Sumo people from Niigata Prefecture
Komusubi